Pretty Maids is a Danish hard rock/heavy metal band from Horsens. Formed in 1981 by Ken Hammer, and completed with Ronnie Atkins in 1982, their sound and music can be described as classic guitar-laden heavy rock with a strong emphasis on melody.

Over the years, Pretty Maids have sold hundreds of thousands of records, but have never broken through in a major way, except in Japan during the 1990s. They have supported well known bands such as Black Sabbath, Whitesnake, Deep Purple, Alice Cooper, and Saxon, and were also featured at the 1987 German version of Monsters of Rock, where Metallica headlined along with Deep Purple.

After a prolonged international touring hiatus before the release of the 2006  Wake Up to the Real World album, the band have every year since been touring their primary markets of Denmark, Sweden, France, Germany and Japan.

History

1980s 
Pretty Maids were formed in 1981 by friends Ken Hammer and John Jacobsen in Horsens, Denmark. Ronnie Atkins joined Pretty Maids in 1982, replacing John Jacobsen on vocals. They wrote their own material and a self-financed demo resulted in a deal with the English record label Bullet Records.

In 1983, the band released their debut self-titled EP under the name Pretty Maids, recognition was fuelled by their UK tour the same year. In 1984 they signed to CBS Records in Denmark, who remixed and re-released their self-titled EP with a different cover.

In 1984, the band released their debut studio album, Red, Hot and Heavy, which was a success. More acclaim followed with their second studio album, Future World, released in 1987. It was recorded in Bearsville Studios, New York, with renowned producer Eddie Kramer. The collaboration did not work out and Flemming Rasmusen ended up producing the more hard rocking songs and Kevin Elson produced the more melodic tracks.

1990s
The 1990 follow up Jump the Gun, produced by Deep Purple bassist Roger Glover, offered more of the same catchy riffs. The band more or less broke up after the lack of success with this record, leaving only founding members Ron Atkins and Ken Hammer.

They would not quit so recruited drummer Michael Fast and bass player Kenn Jackson, and went on to record Sin-Decade in 1992, once again teaming up with Metallica's producer Flemming Rasmussen. The album produced the hit single "Please Don't Leave Me" - a John Sykes/Phil Lynott cover which opened the band up to an even wider audience.

The band did very well in Japan in the first half of the 1990s and have a large fanbase there. 

In 1995 however, the band surprised the fans and critics by releasing the storming Scream. This was an altogether heavier and guitar-lead approach which gained numerous plaudits and saw the band release their first live album, Screamin' Live.

The follow-up Spooked, released in 1997, was regarded by many as an instant classic, maintaining the energy and heaviness of Scream whilst still capturing the quintessential melody that is Pretty Maids.

1999's Anything Worth Doing Is Worth Overdoing produced the commercial, hard driving rock song Hell on High Heels.

2000s

In 2000, the band released the album Carpe Diem, which was more melodic than their previous offerings, disappointing certain factions of their fan-base.

In 2002, Pretty Maids released the album Planet Panic which was a trip back to the heavier sides of their catalogue.

In 2003, their management company Rock On went bankrupt due to some unwise business moves in September 2002. This left Pretty Maids in a bad financial situation and also left them with a lot of legal problems as well as lot of business and copyright mess.

Lead guitarist Ken Hammer had a heart attack on 6 December 2003. He has since recovered completely and has been on stage numerous times since the incident.

As of July 2005, the drummer since 1991, Michael Fast, decided to leave before the recording of Wake Up to the Real World - an album that was originally intended to be released in 2005, but the initial recordings was postponed to the summer of 2006. In April 2006, new drummer Allan Tschicaja (Royal Hunt, Kingdom Come) was announced as Michael Fast's replacement. In 2006, Morten Sandager (ex-Mercenary) joined Pretty Maids, playing the keyboards.

2010s
On 14 May 2010, Pretty Maids released their twelfth studio album, Pandemonium, through Frontiers Records, which was a fantastic "comeback album" although they never had been gone. First single released from the album was Little Drops Of Heaven. In April 2010, Pretty Maids announced that they have parted ways with bass player Kenn Jackson. In May 2010, it was announced that American bass player Hal Patino (formerly of King Diamond) had temporarily replaced Jackson. Patino announced in April 2011 that he had left Pretty Maids.

Celebrating their 30th anniversary, Pretty Maids played a concert at Tivoli, Copenhagen, which featured Rene Shades [Mike Tramp] on bass. 

On 15 September 2012, Pretty Maids played in the US for the first time at the ProgPower festival.

Pretty Maids released their thirteenth studio album Motherland on 22 March in Europe and on 26 March in North America through Frontiers Records. Ronnie Atkins has called it the band's "best album song by song".

In December 2015, Pretty Maids announced that their fifteenth studio album is set to be released in 2016.

In February 2016, Pretty Maids announced that keyboard player Morten Sandager had left the band. In September 2016, Pretty Maids announced that Chris Laney has joined the band, playing keyboards and guitars.

Pretty Maids released their fifteenth studio album Kingmaker on 4 November 2016 through Frontiers Records.

On 1 May 2017 it was announced that drummer Allan Tschicaja had left the band. In a statement he said: "It’s been a difficult decision for me, but I want to focus more on family, friends and other projects." He was replaced by Allan Sørensen on 9 May 2017, where he played for the first time with Pretty Maids on their opening slot for Kiss in Horsens, Denmark.

On 9 July 2019 it was announced that Pretty Maids were forced to cancel their September 2019 ProgPower appearance due to personnel changes.

2020s
In March 2020, the band's lead singer and frontman Ronnie Atkins revealed that he had been diagnosed with lung cancer at the end of 2019. Despite the initial treatment proving successful, his cancer went out of remission in October 2020. In 2021, Atkins released his debut solo album One Shot in lieu of touring or working in the studio with Pretty Maids, mainly for health and logistical reasons. In November 2021, the band released two authorized books. One in Danish called "40 år med Pretty Maids", based on interviews with Ken Hammer and Ronnie Atkins.  "We Came To Rock – The Official Pretty Maids Journals" is written in English and based on interviews with former and present members of the band, managers etc as well as a journal of the whereabouts for 40 years.

Influences and legacy
Pretty Maids have on various occasions mentioned Thin Lizzy, Led Zeppelin, Deep Purple, Kiss, Icon, Slade, and Queen as some of their influences.

Over the years, they have recorded cover songs from many of these influences, including their most famous hit to date: A 1992 cover of John Sykes' ballad, "Please Don't Leave Me".

Pretty Maids' song "Back to Back" from their debut album Red, Hot and Heavy was covered by two Swedish metal bands; HammerFall on their Legacy of Kings album in 1998, and Arch Enemy on their Will to Power album in 2017.

Band members

Timeline

Discography

Studio albums
Red Hot and Heavy (1984)
Future World (1987)
Jump the Gun (1990)
Sin-Decade (1992)
Stripped (acoustic) (1993)
Scream (1994)
Spooked (1998)
The Best Of: Back To Back (compilation) (1998)
Anything Worth Doing Is Worth Overdoing (1999)
Carpe Diem (2000)
Planet Panic (2002)
Wake Up to the Real World (2006)
Pandemonium (2010)
Motherland (2013)
Louder Than Ever (compilation) (2014)
Kingmaker (2016)
Undress Your Madness (2019)
Blast From the Past (compilation) (2019)

References

External links

Official website
Comprehensive German fansite and fanclub
Japanese fanclub
Complete discography with pictures and small bio

Danish glam metal musical groups
Danish hard rock musical groups
Danish heavy metal musical groups
Frontiers Records artists
Musical groups established in 1981
Musical quintets
People from Horsens